Reuben Alexander Munday (February 10, 1900 – July 12, 1972) was an American football coach.  He was the ninth head football coach at Tennessee A&I State College—now known as Tennessee State University—in Nashville, Tennessee, serving for two seasons, from 1937 to 1938, and compiling a record of 9–2–1.

References

External links
 

1900 births
1972 deaths
Tennessee State Tigers football coaches
Tennessee State University faculty
Tuskegee University faculty
Hampton University alumni
University of Iowa alumni
University of Massachusetts alumni
People from Berea, Kentucky
African-American coaches of American football
20th-century African-American people